The Habsburg Myth ( or) is the name given to a political myth present in the historiography and literature of some Central and Eastern European countries, particularly in Austria, according to which the past rule of the Habsburg monarchy led to an era of prosperity in the region to look back on. The concept was coined by the Italian Germanist Claudio Magris in his 1963 thesis Il mito asburgico nella letteratura austriaca moderna ("The Habsburg Myth in modern Austrian literature").

Some important novelists that helped the emergence of what is nowadays referred to as the Habsburg Myth were Stefan Zweig and Joseph Roth. A possible correlation has been made between the Habsburg Myth and the rise of fascism in parts of Europe in the 20th century. It has also been related to the current European Union (EU), as some early proponents of European integration and a pan-European identity were inspired in the supranational multiethnic Habsburg Monarchy.

See also
 Sissi (film), a film which portrays the Habsburg Myth

References

Historiography of Austria
Historiography of Italy
Myth
Austrian literature